The 1967–68 season was the 84th football season in which Dumbarton competed at a Scottish national level, entering the Scottish Football League, the Scottish Cup and the Scottish League Cup. In addition Dumbarton competed in the Stirlingshire Cup.

Scottish Second Division

Manager Willie Toner was to wield the axe with the playing staff before the start of the season, and a number of long serving players were to leave the club.  However, with only one win taken from the first five league games, Willie Toner's youth policy was not proving successful and he resigned his position as manager to be replaced a week later by Ian Spence.  The damage however had already been done and Dumbarton finished in 10th place, with 33 points, 29 behind champions St Mirren.

Scottish League Cup

In the League Cup, a single draw was all that there was to show from the six sectional games and therefore once again Dumbarton were no have no further interest in the competition.

Scottish Cup

In the Scottish Cup, Dumbarton were to fall in the first preliminary round to Berwick Rangers, after a draw.

Stirlingshire Cup
Locally, for the third season in a row Dumbarton were to taste defeat, not on the pitch, but in the boardroom after the game as the Stirlingshire Cup semi final tie against Stirling Albion was decided by the toss of a coin.

Friendlies

Player statistics

Squad 

|}

Source:

Transfers
Amongst those players joining and leaving the club were the following:

Players in

Players out 

Source:

References

Dumbarton F.C. seasons
Scottish football clubs 1967–68 season